Çaldere can refer to:

 Çaldere, Kemaliye
 Çaldere, Silvan